A Kiss in the Dreamhouse is the fifth studio album by British rock band Siouxsie and the Banshees. It was released on 5 November 1982 by Polydor Records. The record marked a change of musical direction, as the group used strings for the first time and experimented in the studio. Guitarist John McGeoch played more instruments, including recorder and piano. For Julian Marszalek of The Quietus, the release proved the Banshees to be "one of the great British psychedelic bands."

Both a critical and commercial success, A Kiss in the Dreamhouse peaked at No. 11 on the UK Albums Chart. In August 2007 it was included in Mojo staff's 80 favourite albums of the 1980s. A 180g vinyl LP reissue of the album, remastered from the original ¼” tapes and cut half-speed at Abbey Road Studios by Miles Showell, was released in September 2018.

In 2023, a clear and gold marbled vinyl edition will be released for Record Store Day on April 22nd in the UK, France, Germany, Australia, Ireland, and Italia. The reissue was overseen by the band's two founders Siouxsie Sioux and Steven Severin.

Background, production and music 
The band held back from writing after the success of 1981's Juju. During the spring of 1982, they went on tour in Scandinavia with three tracks completed: "Cascade", "Painted Bird" and "Green Fingers". When they returned to the studio in July, the group embarked on a week of improvisation sparked off by a tape-looped section of the orchestral version of "Fireworks", a non-album single they had released in May. Other numbers followed easily. Siouxsie didn't want to use synthesizers for the arrangements:"Fireworks" indicated the direction we wanted for the album. We wanted strings [...] John [McGeoch] wanted a machine but Steven [Severin] and I said it had to be real strings. They give a real, earthy, rich sound. You could hear the strings spitting and breathing and wheezing. Me and Steve have always wanted our music to be performed by the Royal Philharmonic Orchestra. We've always thought our songs would suit orchestration. Real strings have a very physical sound".

A Kiss in the Dreamhouse was the first album on which the Banshees really exploited the possibilities of the studio. They allowed themselves to be inspired by sounds. Engineer Mike Hedges, who was interested in vocals, put different effects on Siouxsie's voice and multi-layered it. Hedges also encouraged them to fiddle with effects; if the band came up with something off-the-wall, he'd want to top it.

According to the band, A Kiss in the Dreamhouse was probably their most experimental work. The album contains recorders, chimes, tubular bells, loops and many vocal overdubs. Consequence of Sound described the album as the band's "own form of neo-psychedelic rock."

The personal dynamics associated with the period in which A Kiss in the Dreamhouse was recorded were often less than healthy. The band's recently fired manager and Siouxsie's former partner, Nils Stevenson, had become obsessive in response to her developing relationship with Budgie. The band spent long hours in the studio, fuelled by drink and drugs. According to Uncut writer Garry Mulholland, the "stunningly beautiful music" of Dreamhouse was "a product of addiction, stress, old, sick love and new, dangerous love, money woes and a darkness that would eventually claim three lives".

Title and artwork

The title of the album came to Severin after watching a programme about Hollywood prostitutes in the 1940s who had cosmetic surgery to look like stars, so they could get more clients. The "Dreamhouse" was a brothel in Los Angeles that actually existed where people could meet perfect replicas of the stars of the time, women like Mae West.

The quote in the inner sleeve, "Nellie the Elephant packed his trunk and said goodbye to the circus", referred to longtime former manager Stevenson (nicknamed "Nellie"), who was fired before the recording of the album.

The album's artwork was inspired by the paintings of Gustav Klimt. As the Banshees achieved the richness they desired, they wanted "a really colourful sleeve with lots of gold and deep colours because we felt the music was very rich".

Critical reception 

The UK music press was unanimous in its praise for the album on its release. NME'''s Richard Cook considered it innovative: "A Kiss in the Dreamhouse is a feat of imagination scarcely ever recorded. It's breathtaking. Somehow, a bold assurance of intention has met with a hunger for experimenting with sound to expand an already formidable group of songs into pure, open-minded ambiguity. The flesh of the song will balloon out or contort into unimaginable patterns; indecipherable echoes volley between the walls of the recording; glassy, splintered tones pierce the luxuriant sheen of the mix. Repeated listens trick the sense of balance; tremendous risks are taken. Cook finished his review by saying, "I promise. This music will take your breath away". Another journalist of the NME Paul Du Noyer wrote that A Kiss in the Dreamhouse was "a real departure from rock tradition" and "maybe even their best [album]".Melody Maker's Steve Sutherland also welcomed the new musical direction: "The Banshees achieve an awesome, effective new pop without so much as a theory or qualm. Dreamhouse is an intoxicating achievement". Critic David Cleary of AllMusic would later describe the single "Slowdive" as "a violin-colored dance beat number", with "a catchy melodic hook away from being the real thing", and positively assessed the album, saying, "This fine platter is well worth purchasing".

In 2006, music historian Garry Mulholland included it in his book Fear of Music about the 261 greatest albums since 1976.

In their 2009 review of the reissued album, The Quietus wrote: "The result was their most colourful and – ahem – kaleidoscopic collection yet". Critic Julian Marszalek commented that the album's music is "fundamentally pop, yet unafraid to revel in a quirkiness born of altered states. A deliberate shift from the overt darkness of its predecessor, Juju". Marszalek qualified the work of guitarist McGeoch as "a seamless beauty", and wrote that "Siouxsie's voice achieves a sense of strength and maturity". The journalist concluded the review by noting that "Siouxsie and the Banshees weren't afraid to stretch themselves. Here was a band that dared to challenge itself as much as their listeners".

 Legacy 
Several bands later covered and sampled songs from this album. LCD Soundsystem released a version of "Slowdive" as the B-side to their single "Disco Infiltrator"; it was also included on their Introns compilation in 2006. The Beta Band sampled the live Nocturne version of "Painted Bird" on their track "Liquid Bird", issued on their 2003 album Heroes to Zeros.

 Track listing 

 Personnel 

 Siouxsie and the Banshees 
 Siouxsie Sioux – vocals, bells on "Obsession", production
 Steven Severin – bass guitar, six-string bass guitar on "Slowdive", organ on "Painted Bird", production
 John McGeoch –  guitar, keyboards on "Cocoon", "Circle" and "Cascade", recorder on "Green Fingers", production
 Budgie – drums, percussion, harmonica on "Slowdive", production

 Additional personnel 
 Caroline Lavelle – cello on "Obsession"
 Alison Briggs – cello on "Obsession"
 Anne Stephenson – violin on "Obsession" and "Slowdive"
 Virginia Hewes – violin on "Obsession" and "Slowdive"

 Production and artwork 
 Mike Hedges – engineering
 Rocking Russian – sleeve design
 Michael Kostiff – sleeve photography and set

Charts

Certifications

 References 

 Sources
 
 Mulholland, Garry. A Kiss in the Dreamhouse,  Uncut, November 2012, pp 16–21
 Paytress, Mark. Siouxsie & the Banshees: The Authorised Biography''. Sanctuary, 2003. 

Siouxsie and the Banshees albums
1982 albums
Polydor Records albums
Geffen Records albums